Sumkidz Inc. (now known as Suma) was an artist-driven, community-focused collective based in Toronto, Canada.  The organization was responsible for the coordination and promotion of the OM Festival, and was a supporter and promoter of the electronic music community in Canada.

Description 
Sumkidz promoted community arts and electronic music, as well as social and environmental justice. The collective made decisions through consensus. 

For many years, the collective owned 'the DubBus', a green, full sized school bus which was used to support various Sumkidz and Sumkidz-affiliated events. It had been converted to run  on waste vegetable oil.  Sumkidz had taken the bus on tour around Canadian and US cities to promote and offer workshops on topics relating to clean energy, environmental awareness, arts and music. The bus is sadly, no longer in service.

See also
 OM Festival
 Not-for-profit corporation
 Harm reduction

External links
 Sumantics
 Message Board
 Toronto Arts Online: Sumkidz Winter Solstice Gathering
 Toronto Underground: Sumkidz Winter Solstice Gathering
 Spraci Canada: Sumkidz winter solstice party!

Electronic music organizations
Organizations based in Toronto
Music organizations based in Canada
Youth organizations based in Canada